Hyalaethea metaphaea is a moth of the subfamily Arctiinae. It was described by Herbert Druce in 1898. It is found on the Solomon Islands.

References

Arctiinae
Moths described in 1898